The 2020–21 curling season began in August 2020 and ended in May 2021.

Note: In events with two genders, the men's tournament winners will be listed before the women's tournament winners.

World Curling Federation events

Source:

Championships

Qualification events

Curling Canada events

Source:

Championships

Provincial and territorial playdowns

Other events

National championships

Czech Republic

Estonia

Finland

Hungary

Latvia

Japan

New Zealand

Norway

Russia

South Korea

Spain

Sweden

Switzerland

United States

World Curling Tour

Teams
See: List of teams on the 2020–21 World Curling Tour

Grand Slam events in bold.
Note: More events may be posted as time progresses.

Men's events

Source:

Women's events

Source:

Mixed doubles events

Source:

WCF rankings

Due to the COVID-19 pandemic, the points system was initially suspended until November 30, 2020 due to many of the events at the start of the season being cancelled. Later on, it was announced no teams would be receiving points for the season due to the pandemic.

References

2020-21
2020-21
Seasons in curling